Dave Hodge (born January 8, 1945) is a Canadian sports announcer. Hodge worked for TSN, the CBC and CFRB 1010 radio in Toronto.

Early Years

Born in Montreal, Hodge began his career as a sportswriter with the Chatham Daily News in 1965, then on to local radio CFCO in 1966 and onto to CFRB from 1968 to 1986.

Broadcasting career
Hodge served as play-by-play announcer for the Buffalo Sabres radio broadcasts in their inaugural season 1970–71, with Ted Darling calling the TV play-by-play. In 1971, he left the Sabres and joined the CBC; he beat out Alex Trebek to become the lead host for Hockey Night in Canada from 1971 until 1987, working 15 Stanley Cup Finals. He was often joined in the studio by colourful analysts, such as Howie Meeker and Don Cherry. He also announced the Toronto Argonauts Canadian Football League radio broadcasts from 1974 to 1980.

Pen Flip
On March 14, 1987, Hodge was the in-studio host as the CBC carried a game between the Calgary Flames and Toronto Maple Leafs. The game ended early and the network switched over to a regional game between the Philadelphia Flyers and Montreal Canadiens for the end of the third period. The game was tied 3-3 when the third period ended just before 11 PM Eastern time, meaning overtime would be required. CBC executives decided to cut away after 11:00 and that only viewers in Quebec (who had also seen the game from the start) would get to continue watching.  A visibly disgusted Hodge apprised viewers of the situation, concluding his remarks by flipping his pen in the air:

Following the on-air incident, Hodge quit. He was told he could have his old job back if he apologized. He stated that he had nothing to apologize for and took a different job.

After the CBC
By the time of his termination, Hodge had already moved to Vancouver, where he was working as the sports director of radio station CKNW and serving as the host of Vancouver Canucks radio broadcasts that did not conflict with his CBC duties. He continued to reside in Vancouver and work for CKNW for the next few years.

Afterward, he was hired by Can-West Global to host their coverage of the 1987 and 1988 Stanley Cup playoffs, which included some games in the finals each year. Hodge was then the lead play-by-play broadcaster for the Canadian Football League's league-run Canadian Football Network broadcast service from 1987 to 1990. He returned to hockey as the lead voice of the Minnesota North Stars television broadcasts in 1991, and also hosted regional television broadcasts for the Toronto Maple Leafs on Global and TSN, and for the Canucks on BCTV.

Hodge joined TSN in 1992 and hosted TSN Inside Sports and its spinoff, That's Hockey. He also co-hosted the 1998 NHL Entry Draft.

Hodge hosted a Sunday morning show called The Reporters from 2002 until its cancellation in 2017. He currently provides commentary for TSN's NHL coverage.

Surprise 2018 HNIC appearance
On Saturday, November 24, 2018, Hodge made a surprise appearance on the pregame portion Hockey Night in Canada.  Notably, it was Hodge's first appearance on HNIC since the "pen flip" incident more than 31 years before.  He was invited to appear at the suggestion of present HNIC host Ron MacLean.  MacLean, who had replaced Hodge in 1987, interviewed him for about six minutes.  Hodge and the rest of the HNIC on-air personalities wore retro sky blue HNIC blazers that would later be sold at auction with proceeds going to the charity Hockey Fights Cancer.

Awards
In 2012, he was given the Brian Williams Media Award.

References

External links 
Dave Hodge's Biography at tsn.ca

 
The Dave Hodge Pen Flip (1986)
 

1945 births
Living people
Anglophone Quebec people
Buffalo Sabres announcers
Canadian Football League announcers
Canadian radio sportscasters
Canadian television sportscasters
Major League Baseball broadcasters
Minnesota North Stars announcers
National Football League announcers
National Hockey League broadcasters
Journalists from Montreal
Vancouver Canucks announcers
CBC Television people